FC Kristall Sergach was a Russian football team from Sergach. It played professionally from 1994 to 1996. Their best result was 5th place in Zone 5 of the Russian Third League in 1996.

External links
  Team history at KLISF

Association football clubs established in 1994
Association football clubs disestablished in 1999
Defunct football clubs in Russia
Sport in Nizhny Novgorod Oblast
1994 establishments in Russia
1999 disestablishments in Russia